The Trespasser is a 1947 American action film directed by George Blair, written by Dorrell McGowan, Stuart E. McGowan and Jerome Gruskin, and starring Dale Evans, Warren Douglas, Janet Martin, Douglas Fowley, Adele Mara and Gregory Gaye. It was released on July 3, 1947, by Republic Pictures.

Plot

Cast   
Dale Evans as Linda Coleman
Warren Douglas as Danny 'Dan' Butler
Janet Martin as Stephanie 'Stevie' Carson
Douglas Fowley as Bill Monroe
Adele Mara as Dee Dee
Gregory Gaye as Mr. E. Charles
Grant Withers as Detective Lt. Kirk
William Bakewell as Bruce Coleman
Vince Barnett as Bartender
Francis Pierlot as Channing Bliss
Joy Barlow as Mary Lou 
Fred Graham as Davis
Dale Van Sickel as Hall
Betty Alexander as Jane Walters
Joseph Crehan as The Doctor

References

External links 
 

1947 films
American action films
1940s action films
Republic Pictures films
Films directed by George Blair
American black-and-white films
1940s English-language films
1940s American films